Achit is an urban locality (a work settlement) and the administrative center of Achitsky District of Sverdlovsk Oblast, Russia. Population:

References 

Urban-type settlements in Sverdlovsk Oblast